Sidinei Antonio Zeferino De Oliveira (born 28 June 1984), known as Sidinei, is a football midfielder from Brazil currently playing for the SC Bregenz.

Career 
He has previously played for CA Metropolitano, FC Lustenau, Austria Lustenau, SC Brühl and FC Wolfurt.

External links
 
 

1984 births
Living people
Brazilian footballers
Association football midfielders
Clube Atlético Metropolitano players
FC Lustenau players
SC Austria Lustenau players
SW Bregenz players
Sportspeople from Paraná (state)